"To Lose My Life" is a single by London indie rock band White Lies. It was released on 12 January 2009, one week before the release of the band's debut album, To Lose My Life.... "To Lose My Life" was featured in the soundtrack of the 2009 game, DiRT 2. In May 2010, the show 90210 played this song in the end scene. The song was also featured in a promo for the hit TV series, The Vampire Diaries, as well as being featured in Episode 7 of Season 1.
The Hills played this song in the episode "Crazy In Love" of 5th season (4th episode).

Recording history
The single was recorded during one of the band's album sessions which took place between May and September 2008. The video for the single was directed by Andreas Nilsson, who directed the video for the band's previous single "Death".

Track listing
CD
"To Lose My Life"
"To Lose My Life" (Filthy Dukes remix)

7" vinyl (1)
"To Lose My Life"
"Taxidermy"

7" vinyl (2)
"To Lose My Life"
"Farewell to the Fairground" (Yuksek remix)

iTunes Exclusive
"To Lose My Life" (Tommy Sparks remix)

Charts

References

2009 singles
White Lies (band) songs
Song recordings produced by Ed Buller
2009 songs
Fiction Records singles